Kauma Adventist High School is a coeducational Christian secondary school located on the island of Abemama, Kiribati, established in 1957. It is a boarding school operated by the Seventh-day Adventist Church. The Adventist mission headquarters for Kiribati, formerly the Gilbert Islands, have been located on Abemama since the late 1940s. An elementary school began there in 1955 shortly after the organizing of the first congregation in the mission.

History
Adventist church worker John T. Howse began the Gilbert and Ellice Islands Mission in 1947. He arrived via the church's newly appointed mission boat, the Fetu Ao, or the "Day Dawn". The mission's first church was organized in 1954. The next year a school began. By 1957, a boarding high school was established. The Fetu Ao traveled among the islands and brought students to the school. It did this up to the early 1970s.

Geography
The islands of the Gilbert chain consist of coral rather than soil. Agriculture is quite limited. The main crop is coconuts. Abemama is a small "C"-shaped island which encircles a lagoon. The school is located in view of the ocean and the pounding of the surf is part of school life.

See also

 Education in Kiribati
 List of boarding schools
 List of Seventh-day Adventist secondary schools
 Religion in Kiribati

References

External links
Kauma Adventist High School - Adventist Yearbook

1957 establishments in the Gilbert and Ellice Islands
Co-educational boarding schools
Day schools
Educational institutions established in 1957
Christian schools in Kiribati
Private schools in Oceania
Secondary schools affiliated with the Seventh-day Adventist Church